Lognes is a community in the eastern suburbs of Paris, France. It is located in the Seine-et-Marne department in the Île-de-France  from the center of Paris.

The community of Lognes is part of the Val Maubuée sector, one of the four sectors in the "new town" of Marne-la-Vallée.

Demographics

Ethnicities
Lognes has the highest proportion of Asians of any town in France, over 40% of the population being of Asian descent, almost exclusively being or having ancestry from the former colonies of French Indochina (Cambodia, Laos, and Vietnam) as well as China. Ethnic business districts and community associations serving the Asian population are found throughout the city, in contrast to the circumstances coming from quick assimilation often characteristic of the Vietnamese, Laotian, and Cambodian populations in France.

As of 1998, 26% of the population was Asian.

Transportation
Lognes is served by Lognes station on Paris RER line A.

Education
The town has the following primary school groups (preschool and elementary school):
 Groupe scolaire Le Segrais
 Groupe scolaire Le Four
 Groupe scolaire La Maillière
 Groupe scolaire Le Village
 Groupe scolaire Le Mandinet

There are two junior high schools, Collège Le Segrais and Collège La Maillière, and one senior high school/sixth-form college, Lycée Emily Brontë.

Lognes has the following tertiary educational institutions:
 Unité Clinique Ostéopathique ADERO
 Ecole Supérieure de Management en Alternance
 Ecole Supérieure de Commerce International
 RISE Marne la Vallée
 Polytheig école des hautes études d’information et de gestion
Centre de formation d’apprentis SUP’TG is in Marne-la-Vallée. University of Marne-la-Vallée is in Champs-sur-Marne.

See also
Communes of the Seine-et-Marne department

References

External links

Official Site 
1999 Land Use, from IAURIF (Institute for Urban Planning and Development of the Paris-Île-de-France région) 

Communes of Seine-et-Marne
Little Saigons
Val Maubuée